"Write It on Your Skin" is a song by English singer-songwriter and musician Newton Faulkner from his third studio album of the same name. The song was released on 20 May 2012 in the UK as the lead single from the album. The song peaked to number 54 on the UK Singles Chart. The song was written and produced by Newton Faulkner.

Track listing
Digital download
 "Write It on Your Skin" - 3:14

Credits and personnel
Lead vocals – Newton Faulkner
Producers – Newton Faulkner
Lyrics – Newton Faulkner
Label: RCA Records

Chart performance

Release history

References

2012 singles
Newton Faulkner songs
Songs written by Newton Faulkner
2011 songs
RCA Records singles